The Complete Studio Recordings is a ten compact disc box set by the English rock group Led Zeppelin, released by Atlantic Records on 24 September 1993. It contains all nine of the original Led Zeppelin studio albums digitally remastered, plus an expanded version of the posthumous release Coda. The discs are physically paired together in double-disc booklets and arranged in chronological order, with the exception of Presence (placed between Houses of the Holy and Physical Graffiti) being paired with Houses of the Holy in order to keep the two discs of Physical Graffiti together in the same case.

Four bonus tracks were added to the Coda disc. These were the previously unreleased "Baby Come On Home" which had appeared on Led Zeppelin Boxed Set 2 (1993), along with the previously unreleased tracks that had surfaced on the 1990 box set: "Travelling Riverside Blues" and "White Summer/Black Mountain Side", as well as the "Immigrant Song" B-side "Hey, Hey, What Can I Do". This expanded version of Coda created for the box set was also later released to digital stores in 2007 with the digital release of the full Led Zeppelin catalog, but with "Travelling Riverside Blues" omitted due to it already being included in BBC Sessions (1997).

The set also includes a booklet featuring an extended essay by rock journalist Cameron Crowe and photos of the band.

The album cover depicts the inside structure of a zeppelin.

This title was discontinued just prior to the launch of Mothership, and is now superseded by the Definitive Collection Mini LP Replica CD Boxset, released in September 2008.


Track listing

Sales certifications

Release history

Personnel
Led Zeppelin
John Bonham – drums, percussion
John Paul Jones – bass guitar, keyboards, mandolin
Jimmy Page – acoustic and electric guitars, production
Robert Plant – vocals, harmonica

Additional musicians
Sandy Denny – vocals on "The Battle of Evermore"
Viram Jasani – tabla on "Black Mountain Side"
Ian Stewart – piano on "Rock and Roll" and "Boogie with Stu"

production
Yves Beauvais – production
Chuck Boyd – photography
Peter Corriston – design and package concept
Cameron Crowe – liner notes
Richard Creamer – photography
Jim Cummins – photography
Mike Doud – design
Chris Dreja – photography
Elliott Erwitt – photography
BP Fallon – photography
Peter Grant – executive producer
Jeff Griffin – production
George Hardie – cover design
Roy Harper – photography
David Juniper – artwork and design
George Marino – mastering
Jim Marshall – photography
Barry Plummer – photography
Neal Preston – photography
Michael Putland – photography
Zal Schreiber – editing
Eric Spillman – art direction and design
Jay Thompson – photography
Neil Zlozower – photography

References

External links
Atlanticrecordscom announcement

Albums produced by Jimmy Page
Led Zeppelin compilation albums
1993 compilation albums
Atlantic Records compilation albums
Folk rock compilation albums
Albums recorded at A&M Studios
Albums recorded at Morgan Sound Studios
Albums recorded at Sunset Sound Recorders
Albums recorded at Polar Studios
Albums recorded at Electric Lady Studios
Albums recorded at Olympic Sound Studios